LIBERTY is Miliyah Kato's eighth studio album. It was released on March 2, 2016.

Album information
LIBERTY contains singles "Shounen Shoujo, "Piece of Cake", "Lipstick", and " FUTURE LOVER". It was released in two editions: a CD and a CD+DVD with the music videos of the singles,

Reception

Commercial performance 
The album opened at #4 on the weekly Oricon chart and continued to rank for a total of nine weeks. LIBERTY is Kato's first studio album to rank outside of the top three since 2008's TOKYO STAR, which reached #5 but had stronger first week sales. This is her lowest selling studio album.

Despite the poor physical sales the album still managed to reach #1 on iTunes

Track listing

Influences

Fans believe the album was influenced by Grimes's 2015 studio album "Art Angels". Stylistically this was abundant from Miliyah's visuals for the album being a pink cowboy hat which she wore to promote the album and angel wings., which grimes fashioned for her music video "Flesh without Blood" shortly before the release of LIBERTY.  While Miliyah was promoting the album through an instagram video, she was playing the song "Kill V. Maim"  from "Art Angels", which could be seen in the background.

Promotion

Miliyah promoted the album in various ways, through her jewellery line "MIRROR" she released 3 items in theme of LIBERTY a "MIRROR MEXICAN SKULL NECKLACE" selling for ¥13,000 (around $119) the Necklace fit the theme of the "DRAMATIC LIBERTY" tour which featured influences from the Mexican day of the dead. She then had the "LIBERTY RING" which sold for ¥28,000 (around $257) and featured wings which she wore on at the "DRAMATIC LIBERTY" tour and used for the limited edition Blu-Ray/DVD art for the tour. Then finally the "ROSARIO NECKLACE" which sold for ¥45,000 (around $413) which featured Miliyah's consistent use of crosses and the LIBERTY wings all items were made from genuine silver, and had limited qualities and were obtained through a lottery and through the DRAMATIC LIBERTY tour.

During the LIBERTY era Miliyah began some heavy promotion with the fitness clothing brand Under Armour. featuring in various appearances throughout the year, even releasing her own clothing under the brand Later in the campaign she had her signature pink hair and would have promotion photos of LIBERTY during her appearances. Even wearing clothing featuring the LIBERTY wings with the Under Armour clothing during a promotional photo shoot for FRaU magazine.

Miliyah was featured in various magazines during the LIBERTY era, multiple using her promotional shots used in the LIBERTY album booklet. Then also looks in theme with the LIBERTY cowboy style.

There was an advertisement truck featuring the promotional shots for "FUTURE LOVER" driving around Tokyo The album was advertised in various other ways such as, billboards throughout Japan using the promotional shots from the album' art photo shoot.

.

References

2016 albums